Friendly Fire may refer to:

 Friendly fire, an attack on friendly troops while attempting to attack enemy/hostile targets

Film and television 
 Friendly Fire (1979 film), a dramatic TV movie starring Carol Burnett and Ned Beatty
 Friendly Fire (2006 film), a film by Sean Lennon and Michele Civetta
 Friendly Fire (TV series), a 2012 Hong Kong modern serial drama

Literature 
 Friendly Fire: The Illusion of Justice, a 2010 memoir by Adam Bereki
 Friendly Fire, a 1992 essay collection by Bob Black
 Friendly Fire, a 1976 non-fiction book by C. D. B. Bryan
 "Friendly Fire," a 2004 poem by James Michie
Friendly Fire, a 2006 novel by Patrick Gale
 Friendly Fire, a 2002 play by Peter Gill
 Friendly Fire, a fictional superhero on the team Section 8 in the DC Comics universe

Music 
 Friendly Fire (Joe Lovano & Greg Osby album) (1998)
 Friendly Fire (Sean Lennon album) (2006)
 Friendly Fire (Shara Nelson album) (1995)
 Friendly Fire Recordings, an American record label
 Friendly Fires, a UK indie band
 "Friendly Fire", a 2002 song by Pet Shop Boys on the B-side of "I Get Along"

Other uses 
 Friendly Fire (event), a German charity gaming live stream event
 "Friendly Fire", an episode of the web series Meta Runner
 Friendly Fire, a defunct war movie review podcast co-hosted by John Roderick, Adam Pranica and Benjamin Ahr Harrison